Gerrit Stephan Barba Holtmann (born 25 March 1995) is a professional footballer who plays as a winger for Bundesliga club VfL Bochum. Born in Germany, he plays for the Philippines national team.

Club career

Youth
Holtmann played in Bremerhaven for Sparta Bremerhaven, Leher Turnerschaft and OSC Bremerhaven before he joined Werder Bremen's youth academy. In 2013 he joined JFV Bremerhaven.

Eintracht Braunschweig
Holtmann joined the reserve side of Eintracht Braunschweig in the Regionalliga Nord in 2014. On the 30th matchday of the 2014–15 2. Bundesliga season, he made his professional debut for Eintracht's senior side in a match against FC Erzgebirge Aue.

Mainz 05
In June 2016, Holtmann transferred to 1. FSV Mainz 05. On 2 December 2017, he scored his first Bundesliga goal for Mainz in a 3–1 home defeat against FC Augsburg.

Loan to SC Paderborn
On 27 June 2019, he joined SC Paderborn on loan for the 2019–20 season.

VfL Bochum
Holtmann joined VfL Bochum on a three-year contract in August 2020. In January 2022, Holtmann was awarded the 2021 German Goal of the Year for a solo effort he made during a 2–0 home win against 1. FSV Mainz 05.

International career 
Due to Holtmann being born in Germany and the heritage of his parents (his mother is Filipino), he is eligible to play for Germany and the Philippines.

Germany youth
On 7 October 2015, Holtmann made his debut for the German national U-20 team in a match against Turkey.

Philippines
Holtmann decided to suit up for the Philippines around 2016, but wanted to become a regular player in the Bundesliga first.

In March 2021, during an interview, Holtmann said that he was applying for dual citizenship so he would be able to play for the Philippines in their remaining matches in the second round of 2022 FIFA World Cup Asian qualifiers that will be held in China. Two months later in May, he was called up by the Philippines for 2022 FIFA World Cup qualification matches against China, Guam and the Maldives. However, Holtmann was unable to make his Philippines debut in the said tournaments due to "a lack of documents."

Holtmann was included in the 25-man squad of the Philippines for 2022 FAS Tri-Nations Series. However, he was not able to play as he contracted COVID-19 while preparing to fly out to Singapore. In June, however, Holtmann finally got called up to the Philippines squad for the Asian Cup Qualifiers under coach Thomas Dooley. Holtmann made his debut for the Philippines in a match against Mongolia in the third round of the 2023 AFC Asian Cup qualifiers, featuring in the starting lineup. He would go on to score his first goal for the Philippines and the only goal of the game in the 93rd minute to win the match, 1–0.

Career statistics

Club

International

Scores and results list the Philippines' goal tally first, score column indicates score after each Holtmann goal.

Honours
VfL Bochum
 2. Bundesliga: 2020–21

Individual
 Bundesliga Goal of the Month: August 2021
 Bundesliga Goal of the Season: 2021–22

References

External links 

1995 births
Living people
Footballers from Bremen
Citizens of the Philippines through descent
German sportspeople of Filipino descent
Association football forwards
German footballers
Germany youth international footballers
OSC Bremerhaven players
SV Werder Bremen players
Eintracht Braunschweig players
Eintracht Braunschweig II players
1. FSV Mainz 05 players
1. FSV Mainz 05 II players
SC Paderborn 07 players
VfL Bochum players
Bundesliga players
2. Bundesliga players
3. Liga players
Regionalliga players
Philippines international footballers
Filipino footballers